Alexander Ellinger (17 April 1870, Frankfurt am Main – 26 July 1923, Frankfurt am Main) was a German chemist and pharmacologist.

From 1887 he studied chemistry at the University of Berlin under August Wilhelm von Hofmann and at the University of Bonn as a pupil of August Kekulé. Afterwards, he studied medicine at the University of Munich, followed by work as an assistant in the institute of pharmacology at the University of Strasbourg. In 1897 he became an assistant to Max Jaffé in the laboratory of medicinal chemistry and experimental pharmacology at the University of Königsberg. In 1914 he was appointed professor of pharmacology at the newly established University of Frankfurt.

He is remembered for his extensive biochemical research of several amino acids, especially tryptophan. In 1904 he isolated kynurenic acid from the urine of dogs that had been fed tryptophan. His other work included studies on the water exchange between body tissues and blood, on the formation on lymph, and with chemist Karl Spiro, he conducted investigations of blood coagulation.

Partial bibliography

References 

1870 births
1923 deaths
Scientists from Frankfurt
Academic staff of the University of Königsberg
Academic staff of Goethe University Frankfurt
University of Bonn alumni
Humboldt University of Berlin alumni
Ludwig Maximilian University of Munich alumni
German pharmacologists
20th-century German chemists